Sir John Delaval, 3rd Baronet (7 November 1654 – 4 June 1729) was an English politician.

He was the fifth son of Sir Ralph Delaval, 1st Baronet and his wife Anne Leslie, daughter of the 1st Earl of Leven. Delaval succeeded his older brother Ralph as baronet in 1696.

Delaval sat as Member of Parliament (MP) for Morpeth from 1701 until 1705. Subsequently, he represented Northumberland in the Parliament of England until 1707 and then in the Parliament of Great Britain until 1708. Because of financial problems, he had to sell the family's estates to his cousin Admiral George Delaval. In 1729, with his death the baronetcy is presumed to have devolved to his son Thomas and thereafter to have become extinct.

References

1654 births
1729 deaths
Baronets in the Baronetage of England
British MPs 1707–1708
Members of the Parliament of Great Britain for English constituencies
English MPs 1701–1702
English MPs 1702–1705
English MPs 1705–1707